Bet naar de Olympiade  is a 1928 Dutch silent film directed by Theo Frenkel.

External links 
 

Dutch silent feature films
1928 films
Dutch black-and-white films